Reneta Ivanova Indzhova (born 6 July 1953) is a Bulgarian politician and manager. Between October 1994 and January 1995 she served as Prime Minister of Bulgaria, the first, and so far, only, woman in Bulgaria to hold this office.

Biography 
Reneta Indzhova was born 6 July 1953 in Nova Zagora. She studied at the university, obtained a PhD and became professor of political economy. She married and had a child, but later divorced. She worked as a financial expert for the liberal-conservative Democratic Union (UDF) and was head of Bulgaria's Privatization Agency (1992–1994).

Interim Prime Minister of Bulgaria

Indzhova was appointed by President Zhelev, former leader of the UDF, to head a caretaker government after the collapse of Lyuben Berov's cabinet. During her brief time in office she gained some popularity for her efforts to combat organized crime.

Subsequent roles

In 1995 Indzhova ran for Mayor of Sofia as an independent, finishing third. In 2001 she took part in the presidential elections but failed to garner significant support.

In 2014 she appeared in the headlines for the first time in more than a decade. As head of the National Statistical Institute of Bulgaria, she accused her two direct subordinates for exerting undue political pressure in the institution.

Notes

1953 births
20th-century Bulgarian politicians
20th-century Bulgarian women politicians
Living people
People from Nova Zagora
Prime Ministers of Bulgaria
Women prime ministers
University of National and World Economy alumni